Timothy Reed Barker (born 18 August 1956) is a British Anglican priest. Since 2015, he has served as the Dean of Guernsey. From 2009 to 2015, he was the Archdeacon of Lincoln in the Diocese of Lincoln.

Early life and education
Tim Barker was born on 18 August 1956. He was educated at Manchester Grammar School, Queens' College, Cambridge and Westcott House, Cambridge.

Ordained ministry
He was ordained in 1981.  After a curacy in Nantwich he was Vicar of Norton from 1983 to 1988; and then Runcorn until 1994. He was Chaplain to the Bishop of Chester from 1994 to 1998. In that year he became Vicar of Spalding, a post he held for 9 years.

Tim Barker became Dean of Guernsey at the end of November 2015.

References

1956 births
Living people
People educated at Manchester Grammar School
Alumni of Queens' College, Cambridge
Alumni of Westcott House, Cambridge
Archdeacons of Lincoln